The 2013 World Cup of Pool was the eighth edition of the tournament and was held at the York Hall, London from 17 to 22 September 2013. The event was won by the Phillipene team of Lee Vann Corteza and Dennis Orcollo.

Prize fund

 First place (per pair): $60,000
 Second place (per pair): $30,000
 Semi-finalists (per pair): $16,000
 Quarter-finalists (per pair): $10,000	
 Last 16 losers (per pair): $5,000
 Last 32 losers (per pair): $3,000

Teams 

Seeded teams:
 (Mika Immonen and Petri Makkonen)
 A (Darren Appleton and Karl Boyes)
 (Li Hewen and Liu Haitao)
 (Shane Van Boening and Johnny Archer)
 (Niels Feijen and Nick van den Berg)
 (Lee Vann Corteza and Dennis Orcollo)
 (Chang Jung-lin and Ko Pin-yi)
 B (Daryl Peach and Chris Melling)
 (Dominic Jentsch and Ralf Souquet)
 (Nikos Ekonomopoulos and Alexander Kazakis)
 (Radosław Babica and Tomasz Kapłan)
 (Alex Pagulayan and John Morra)
 (Naoyuki Ōi and Lo Li-wen)
 (Konstantin Stepanov and Ruslan Tschinachow)
 (Fabio Petroni and Bruno Muratore)
 (Ryu Sueng-woo and Ham Won-sik)

Unseeded teams:
 (James Delahunty and David Rothall)
 (Albin Ouschan and Jasmin Ouschan)
 (Serge Das and Moritz Lauwereyns)
 (Karlo Dalmatin and Ivica Putnik)
 (Denis Grabe and Erki Erm) [Qualifier 1]
 (Lee Chenman and Kong Bu-Hong)
 (Miko Balasz and Gabor Solymosi)
 (Raj Hundal and Amar Kang)
 (Ricky Yang and Irsal Nasution)
 (Omar Al-Shaheen and Khaled al-Mutairi)
 (Tony Drago and Alex Borg)
 (Manuel Gama and Guilherme Sousa) [Qualifier 2]
 (Aloysius Yapp and Chan Keng Kwang)
 (Jayson Shaw and Jonni Fulcher)
 (David Alcaide and Juan Carlos Exposito)
 (Andreas Gerwen and Marcus Chamat)

Tournament bracket

{{32TeamBracket 
| RD1=Round of 32Race to 7
| RD2=Round of 16Race to 7
| RD3=Quarter-finalsRace to 9 
| RD4=Semi-finalsRace to 9 
| RD5=FinalRace to 10 
| team-width=180px

| RD1-seed01=1
| RD1-team01= Immonen / Makkonen
| RD1-score01=7
| RD1-seed02=
| RD1-team02= Ouschan / Ouschan
| RD1-score02=2

| RD1-seed03=16
| RD1-team03= Ryu / Ham
| RD1-score03=7
| RD1-seed04=
| RD1-team04= Grabe / Erm
| RD1-score04=2

| RD1-seed05=8
| RD1-team05= Peach / Melling
| RD1-score05=7
| RD1-seed06=
| RD1-team06= Gama / Sousa
| RD1-score06=4

| RD1-seed07=9
| RD1-team07= Jentsch / Souquet
| RD1-score07=7
| RD1-seed08=
| RD1-team08= Drago / Borg
| RD1-score08=4

| RD1-seed09=5
| RD1-team09= Feijen / van den Berg
| RD1-score09=7
| RD1-seed10=
| RD1-team10= Shaw / Fulcher
| RD1-score10=2

| RD1-seed11=12
| RD1-team11= Pagulayan / Morra
| RD1-score11=6
| RD1-seed12=
| RD1-team12= Hundal / Kang
| RD1-score12=7

| RD1-seed13=4
| RD1-team13= Van Boening / Archer
| RD1-score13=7
| RD1-seed14=
| RD1-team14= Shaheen / Mutairi
| RD1-score14=5

| RD1-seed15=13
| RD1-team15= Oi / Li-wen
| RD1-score15=7
| RD1-seed16=
| RD1-team16= Gerwen / Chamat
| RD1-score16=4

| RD1-seed17=3
| RD1-team17= Hewen / Haitao
| RD1-score17=2
| RD1-seed18=
| RD1-team18= Balazs / Solymosi
| RD1-score18=7

| RD1-seed19=14
| RD1-team19= Stepanov / Chinakhov
| RD1-score19=7
| RD1-seed20=
| RD1-team20= Chenman / Hong
| RD1-score20=5

| RD1-seed21=6
| RD1-team21= Corteza / Orcollo
| RD1-score21=7
| RD1-seed22=
| RD1-team22= Dalmatin / Putnik
| RD1-score22=4

| RD1-seed23=11
| RD1-team23= Babica / Kaplan
| RD1-score23=5
| RD1-seed24=
| RD1-team24= Yapp / Keng Kwang
| RD1-score24=7

| RD1-seed25=7
| RD1-team25= Jung-lin / Pin-yi
| RD1-score25=7
| RD1-seed26=
| RD1-team26= Das / Lauweryns
| RD1-score26=5

| RD1-seed27=10
| RD1-team27=

References

External links
 World Cup of Pool 2013 at AZBilliards.com

2013
2013 in cue sports
2013 sports events in London
2013 in English sport
September 2013 sports events in the United Kingdom
International sports competitions in London